The following is a list of Chinese films first released in 2015.

Highest-grossing films
These are the top 10 grossing Chinese films that were released in China in 2015:

2015 films

January – March

April – June

July – September

October–December

See also 
2015 in China
List of 2015 box office number-one films in China

References

External links
Most Popular Titles With Country of Origin China

2015
Films
Lists of 2015 films by country or language